

Hollywood movies set and shot in Montreal
Wait Until Dark (1967), starring Audrey Hepburn, Alan Arkin, Richard Crenna (set primarily in New York but some of it was filmed in Montreal, which also features as a setting in the beginning)
La course du lièvre à travers les champs [And Hope to Die] (1972), Jean-Louis Trintignant, Aldo Ray, Robert Ryan
The Apprenticeship of Duddy Kravitz (1974), Richard Dreyfuss, Jack Warden, Randy Quaid, Joseph Wiseman
Tulips (1981) Gabe Kaplan, Bernadette Peters
The Jackal (1997), starring Bruce Willis, Richard Gere, Sidney Poitier
The Whole Nine Yards (2000), starring Bruce Willis, Matthew Perry
The Score (2001), starring Robert De Niro, Edward Norton, Marlon Brando
Taking Lives (2004), starring Angelina Jolie, Ethan Hawke, Kiefer Sutherland
Blades of Glory (2007), Will Ferrell, Jon Heder, Amy Poehler
Away We Go (2009), John Krasinski, Maya Rudolph and Allison Janney
Life of Pi (2012), Suraj Sharma, Irrfan Khan
Come As You Are (2019),  Grant Rosenmeyer, Hayden Szeto, Ravi Patel, Janeane Garofalo, Gabourey Sidibe
The Voyeurs (2021), Sydney Sweeney, Justice Smith, Ben Hardy, and Natasha Liu Bordizzo
Crisis (2021), Gary Oldman, Armie Hammer, Evangeline Lilly, Greg Kinnear, Michelle Rodriguez, Scott Mescudi
Three Pines (2022), Alfred Molina, Rossif Sutherland, Elle-Máijá Tailfeathers (Amazon Prime series)

Hollywood movies shot in Montreal
City on Fire (1979), starring Barry Newman, Susan Clark
Quintet (1979), directed by Robert Altman; shot on the former Expo 67 site
Once Upon a Time in America (1984), directed by Sergio Leone, starring Robert De Niro, James Woods, Joe Pesci
The Freshman (1990), starring Marlon Brando, Matthew Broderick
Love and Human Remains (1993), starring Thomas Gibson, Ruth Marshall
Brainscan (1994),  starring Edward Furlong, Frank Langella
Mrs. Parker and the Vicious Circle (1994), starring Jennifer Jason Leigh, Campbell Scott
12 Monkeys (1995), Bruce Willis, Madeline Stowe
Johnny Mnemonic (1995), starring Keanu Reeves, Dolph Lundgren, Dina Meyer
The Long Kiss Goodnight (1996), starring Geena Davis, Samuel L. Jackson
Mother Night (1996), starring Nick Nolte, Sheryl Lee, John Goodman, Alan Arkin, Frankie Faison
The Assignment (1997), starring Aidan Quinn, Donald Sutherland, Ben Kingsley
Batman & Robin (1997),  starring George Clooney, Chris O'Donnell, Uma Thurman
Barney's Great Adventure (1998), starring Bob West, George Hearn, Shirley Douglas
The Red Violin (1998), starring Samuel L. Jackson, Colm Feore
Snake Eyes (1998), Starring Nicolas Cage, Gary Sinise, Carla Gugino
A Walk on the Moon (1999), starring Diane Lane, Viggo Mortensen
The Bone Collector (1999), starring Denzel Washington, Angelina Jolie, Queen Latifah
2001: A Space Travesty (2000), starring Leslie Nielsen
The Art of War (2000), starring Wesley Snipes, Donald Sutherland, Anne Archer
Battlefield Earth (2000), starring John Travolta, Barry Pepper, Forest Whitaker
Isn't She Great (2000), starring Bette Midler, Nathan Lane
The Heist (2001), starring Gene Hackman, Danny DeVito
Abandon (2002), starring Katie Holmes, Benjamin Bratt
Catch Me If You Can (2002), starring Leonardo DiCaprio, Tom Hanks, Amy Adams
Confessions of a Dangerous Mind (2002), starring Sam Rockwell, Drew Barrymore, George Clooney, Julia Roberts
FeardotCom (2002); starring Stephen Dorff
Gleason (2002); starring Brad Garrett, Saul Rubinek
Lathe of Heaven (2002), starring James Caan, Lukas Haas, Lisa Bonet
No Good Deed (2002), starring Samuel L. Jackson
Beyond Borders (2003), starring Angelina Jolie
Gothika (2003), starring Halle Berry, Robert Downey, Jr, Penélope Cruz
The Human Stain (2003), starring Anthony Hopkins, Nicole Kidman
Shattered Glass (2003), starring Hayden Christensen
The Aviator (2004), starring Leonardo DiCaprio, Cate Blanchett, Kate Beckinsale
Confessions of a Teenage Drama Queen (2004), starring Lindsay Lohan
The Day After Tomorrow (2004), starring Dennis Quaid, Jake Gyllenhaal, Sela Ward and Ian Holm
Head in the Clouds (2004), starring Charlize Theron, Penélope Cruz
Noel (2004), starring Susan Sarandon, Paul Walker, Penélope Cruz
The Notebook (2004), starring James Garner, Rachel McAdams
The Terminal (2004), starring Tom Hanks, Catherine Zeta-Jones; parts were shot at Montréal-Mirabel International Airport for JFK Airport
Wicker Park (2004), starring Josh Hartnett, Rose Byrne
Human Trafficking (2005), starring Donald Sutherland, Mira Sorvino
The Jacket (2005), starring Adrien Brody, Keira Knightley
King's Ransom (2005), starring Anthony Anderson
The Fountain (2006), starring Hugh Jackman, Rachel Weisz
The Last Kiss (2006), starring Zach Braff, Blythe Danner
The Covenant (2006), directed by Renny Harlin, starring Steven Strait, Sebastian Stan
Lucky Number Slevin (2006), starring Josh Hartnett, Bruce Willis
The Woods (2006), starring Agnes Bruckner, Patricia Clarkson
I'm Not There (2007), starring Christian Bale, Cate Blanchett, Richard Gere, Heath Ledger
Universal Groove (2007), starring Corey Haim
The Curious Case of Benjamin Button (2008), starring Brad Pitt
Death Race (2008), starring Jason Statham
Get Smart (2008), starring Steve Carell, Anne Hathaway
Journey to the Center of the Earth (2008), starring Brendan Fraser, Josh Hutcherson
The Mummy: Tomb of the Dragon Emperor (2008), starring Brendan Fraser, Jet Li
Picture This (2008), starring Ashley Tisdale, Robbie Amell, Lauren Collins, Shenae Grimes
Punisher: War Zone (2008), starring Ray Stevenson
Night at the Museum: Battle of the Smithsonian (2009), starring Ben Stiller, Amy Adams, Owen Wilson
Orphan (2009), starring Vera Farmiga, Peter Sarsgaard, Isabelle Fuhrman
Whiteout (2009), starring Kate Beckinsale, Gabriel Macht
Beastly (2011), starring Alex Pettyfer, Vanessa Hudgens, Mary-Kate Olsen
The Factory (2011), starring John Cusack
Immortals (2011), starring Henry Cavill, Freida Pinto, Mickey Rourke
On the Road (2011), starring Kristen Stewart, Sam Riley
Source Code (2011), starring Jake Gyllenhaal, Michelle Monaghan, Vera Farmiga
Erased (2012), starring Aaron Eckhart, Liana Liberato
Upside Down (2011), starring Jim Sturgess, Kirsten Dunst
Warm Bodies (2012), starring Nicholas Hoult, Teresa Palmer, Analeigh Tipton
The Words (2011), starring Bradley Cooper, Olivia Wilde, Zoe Saldana
Riddick (2013), starring Vin Diesel
Red 2 (2013), starring Bruce Willis, Helen Mirren, John Malkovich, Mary-Louise Parker, Catherine Zeta-Jones, and Sir Anthony Hopkins
White House Down (2013), starring Channing Tatum 
X-Men: Days of Future Past (2014), starring Michael Fassbender, Jennifer Lawrence, Hugh Jackman, Ian McKellen, Patrick Stewart, Halle Berry Elliot Page, Nicholas Hoult, Evan Peters
Brick Mansions (2014), starring Paul Walker, David Belle, RZA
John Wick: Chapter 2 (2017), starring Keanu Reeves, Common, Laurence Fishburne, Ian McShane, John Leguizamo
On the Basis of Sex (2018), starring Felicity Jones
Scream VI (2023), starring Courtney Cox, Melissa Barrera, Jenna Ortega, Mason Gooding, Jasmin Savoy Brown, Hayden Panettiere, Samara Weaving

Canadian films
The Act of the Heart (1970), starring Genevieve Bujold and Donald Sutherland
Shivers (1975), by David Cronenberg
Rabid (1977), by David Cronenberg starring Marilyn Chambers
Cathy's Curse (1977), starring Alan Scarfe
The Red Violin (1998), starring Samuel L. Jackson, Jason Flemyng, Greta Scacchi
A Problem with Fear (2003),  starring Paulo Costanzo
End of the Line (2007), starring Ilona Elkin and Nicolas Wright
Barney's Version (2010), starring Dustin Hoffman, Paul Giamatti

Québécois films in English
The Luck of Ginger Coffey (1964), starring Robert Shaw
The Pyx (1973), starring Karen Black
City on Fire (1979), starring Barry Newman, Ava Gardner, Henry Fonda, Shelley Winters, James Franciscus, Leslie Nielsen, Susan Clark
Mambo Italiano (2003), starring Paul Sorvino, Luke Kirby, Mary Walsh, Sophie Lorain, Ginette Reno
Eternal (2004)
The Trotsky (2009), by Jacob Tierney
Good Neighbours (2010), by Jacob Tierney
Boost (2017)

The Diamond Heist (2020) Written and Directed by: Ryan Boucetta

The Diamond Heist Part II (2021) Written and Directed by: Ryan Boucetta

Bilingual Québécois films
Bon Cop, Bad Cop (2006)
Funkytown  (2011)

Québécois films in French
Le Déclin de l'empire américain (1986), by Denys Arcand
Jésus de Montréal (1989), by Denys Arcand
Léolo (1992), by Jean-Claude Lauzon
August 32nd on Earth (Un 32 août sur terre) (1998), by Denis Villeneuve
It's Your Turn, Laura Cadieux (1998), by Denise Filiatrault
Maelström (2000), by Denis Villeneuve, starring Marie-Josée Croze, Jean-Nicolas Verreault; winner of 5 Genie Awards and 7 Jutra Awards
The Barbarian Invasions (Les Invasions barbares) (2003), by Denys Arcand
C.R.A.Z.Y. (2005),  by Jean-Marc Vallée
The Rocket (Maurice Richard) (2005)
October 1970 (2006), story of the FLQ terrorist group and the October Crisis
I Killed My Mother (J'ai tué ma mère) (2009), by Xavier Dolan
Polytechnique (2009), by Denis Villeneuve
Les amours imaginaires (2010), by Xavier Dolan
Incendies (2010), by Denis Villeneuve
Starbuck (2011), starring Patrick Huard, Julie Le Breton
Laurence Anyways (2012), by Xavier Dolan
 Mommy (2014), by Xavier Dolan

International movies set and shot in Montreal
Stateline Motel (1973), by Maurizio Lucidi, starring Ursula Andress, Eli Wallach, Barbara Bach
Mr. Nobody (2009), by Jaco Van Dormael, starring Jared Leto, Diane Kruger
A Trip With Your Wife (2019)
Pieces of a Woman (2020)

References

Montreal in fiction
 
 
Lists of films by setting
Films shot
Lists of films shot in Canada